U.S. Route 150 (US 150) is a 571-mile (919 km) long northwest-southeast United States highway, signed as east–west. It runs from U.S. Route 6 outside of Moline, Illinois to U.S. Route 25 in Mount Vernon, Kentucky.

Route description

Illinois

In the state of Illinois, U.S. 150 runs from the Quad City International Airport at U.S. Route 6 southeast to near Vermilion.

Between Moline and Danville, Route 150 closely parallels Interstate 74.

Indiana

In the state of Indiana, U.S. 150 runs south with U.S. Route 41 from Terre Haute. It is then concurrent with its parent, U.S. Route 50 from Vincennes to Shoals. It then runs east to New Albany before overlapping Interstate 64 into Kentucky. Between Vincennes and New Albany the road follows the original route of the Buffalo Trace.

Kentucky

U.S. 150 runs concurrently with I-64 as it enters Kentucky from Indiana, crossing the Ohio River into Louisville on the Sherman Minton Bridge and exiting the I-64 freeway at North 22nd Street in the Portland neighborhood. From there, U.S. 150 runs south to West Broadway (westbound U.S. 150 follows Dr. W. J. Hodges Street from West Broadway to West Main Street, then runs along the 22nd Street Connector to its merge with North 22nd near Garfield Avenue); U.S. 150 follows Broadway across downtown to Baxter Avenue; after a brief run along Baxter, It then follows Bardstown Road, a major radial artery running southeasterly from downtown, with interchanges at Interstates 264 and 265.

Between West Main and West Broadway in Louisville, U.S. 150 is concurrent with U.S. Route 31W; from East Broadway and Baxter to Bardstown, Kentucky, it is concurrent with U.S. Route 31E. The route along Baxter Avenue and Bardstown Road follows the former Louisville and Bardstown Turnpike through the Highlands district of Louisville and past the historic Farmington plantation at the interchange with the Watterson Expressway (I-264).

U.S. routes 150 and 31E separate at Bardstown near the Martha Layne Collins Blue Grass Parkway. U.S. 150 then continues southeast, around the city of Danville before terminating at Mount Vernon.

History

Illinois
Before 1936, Illinois Route 39 ran from Bloomington to Champaign on the current routing of U.S. 150. In 1936, US 150 extended due northwest from Shoals, Indiana to the Quad Cities. As a result, IL 39 and IL 91 were decommissioned. Not only that, IL 16, IL 80, and IL 121 were truncated. In 1954, a portion of US 150 in Peoria moved from the Franklin Street Bridge to the McClugage Bridge. As a result, US 150 City, later US 150 Bus., appeared in Peoria from 1954 to 1964. In 1971, the decision to remove a portion of US 150 from US 67 in Rock Island to I-74 in Danville failed. However, in 1976, the decision to truncate US 150 from US 67 in Rock Island to US 6 near the Quad City Airport was approved.

Indiana
Initially, US 150 ran from Shoals, Indiana to Louisville, Kentucky. In 1936, US 150 extended due northwest from Shoals to the Quad Cities in Illinois. This caused IN 46 to cut back from the Illinois state line to Terre Haute.

Kentucky

U.S. Route 168 was created in 1926 from Louisville to Mount Vernon, Kentucky, overlapping US 68 between Bardstown and Perryville. In 1934, US 150 absorbed US 168.

Major intersections

Special routes

Springfield business loop

U.S. Route 150 Business (US 150 Bus.) is a special U.S. Route in Springfield, Kentucky. The route runs through downtown Springfield while US 150 bypasses the town to the northeast. It intersects Kentucky state highways 152, 555, 528, 1584, and 1404.

Danville bypass

U.S. Route 150 Bypass (US 150 Byp.) is a special U.S. Route in Danville, Kentucky. The route bypasses Danville to the southwest while US 150 runs through downtown. The route is overlapped by US 127 Byp. for approximately the first half of its length. It intersects US 127, along with Kentucky state routes 34 and 37.

See also
 U.S. Route 50
 U.S. Route 250
 U.S. Route 350
 U.S. Route 450
 U.S. Route 550
 U.S. Route 650
 Roads in Louisville, Kentucky

References

External links

 Endpoints of US highway 150

 
Transportation in Rock Island County, Illinois
Transportation in Henry County, Illinois
Transportation in Knox County, Illinois
Transportation in Peoria County, Illinois
Transportation in Tazewell County, Illinois
Transportation in Woodford County, Illinois
Transportation in McLean County, Illinois
Transportation in DeWitt County, Illinois
Transportation in Piatt County, Illinois
Transportation in Champaign County, Illinois
Transportation in Vermilion County, Illinois
Transportation in Edgar County, Illinois
Transportation in Vigo County, Indiana
Transportation in Sullivan County, Indiana
Transportation in Knox County, Indiana
Transportation in Daviess County, Indiana
Transportation in Martin County, Indiana
Transportation in Orange County, Indiana
Transportation in Washington County, Indiana
Transportation in Harrison County, Indiana
Transportation in Floyd County, Indiana
Transportation in Jefferson County, Kentucky
Transportation in Bullitt County, Kentucky
Transportation in Spencer County, Kentucky
Transportation in Nelson County, Kentucky
Transportation in Washington County, Kentucky
Transportation in Boyle County, Kentucky
Transportation in Lincoln County, Kentucky
Transportation in Rockcastle County, Kentucky
Bloomington–Normal
150
50-1
50-1
50-1
1
0150